Intan is a 2006–2007 Indonesian soap opera starring Naysilla Mirdad, Dude Harlino, Glenn Alinskie, Ingka Noverita, Meriam Bellina, Nani Widjaja, Ninok Wiryono, Umar Lubis, Anwar Fuady, Nunu Datau, Farah Debby, Vera Detty, and Rama Michael. Written by Serena Luna and directed by Doddy Djanas. Produced by SinemArt Production. It aired on RCTI from 6 November 2006 to 22 July 2007 on Mondays to Sundays at 18:00–19:00 WIB, 19:00–20:00 WITA, and 20:00–21:00 WIT for 263 episodes.

Synopsis
Kasih is a girl from a rich family who falls in love with Fajar, a boy from poor family. However, neither family approves of their relationship. One day, Kasih finds out she is pregnant and Fajar is the father. Fajar and Kasih marry. Kasih gives birth to a baby named Intan. They live in penury. Fajar decides to stop his studies and work to meet the needs of his family. However, unfortunately Faiar dies in an accident. Kasih's parents remarry her with Dr. Frans. Kasih does not bring Intan with her to the new marriage, and leaves him with Lastri, Fajar's Mother. Lastri is angry about Kasih's marriage and departure and considers that Kasih has betrayed Fajar by leaving her baby.

Intan (Naysila Mirdad) grows up innocent and sweet, and loves Lastri (Hj. Nani Wijaya) a great deal. Lastri is very protective over Intan because she does not want her future damaged by her father, Fajar. Despite her efforts Lastri Intan gets pregnant. Lastri then asks Ello(Glenn Alinskie), Intan's close friend, to take responsibility. Ello hesitates, as he is at  college, but in the end he decides to marry Intan, although his family is against the union. After they marry, Intan moves to Ello's House. Intan innocently starts a new life with Mr. Arman (Anwar Fuady) Mrs. Nadine (Meriam Bellina) and both of Ello's older brothers; Jemmy (Manfreed) and Rommy (Rama Michael). Happiness doesn't last long for Intan as, a few days after her marriage, Ello has an accident and dies. Nadine and Arman blame Intan for Ello's Death and evict her from the house. Intan begs Arman to let her stay, at least their son is born. Intan gives birth to a son, Rangga (Ryan Maladi). Nadine helps Intan to get to hospital.

Intan's early life in this house is not easy, because Nadine persecutes her. But Intan stands up to her with patience and love, treating Nadine as a mother and eventually Nadine's heart thaws. Intan is uncomfortable about staying on in her mother-in-law's house and, in order to look after her son, starts a sales job. At work, Intan meets Rado (Dude Harlino). and then moves to work at a salon. The salon is owned by Rado's Mother, Wina (Nunu Datau)and there she meets the assistant of the salon owner, Lila (Ingka Noverita). Lila also likes Rado, and tries to separate Intan and Rado. Meanwhile, Kasih is fighting kidney disease and needs a kidney transplantation, but doesn't find a donor match.

Dr. Frans doesn't want to lose Kasih, and finally finds Intan so she can donate her kidney to Kasih. Lastri is very angry when she learns about this and Intan discovers that Kasih is her mother who she believed was dead. Despite the shock, Intan is still willing to donate her kidney. But her wish to do so is rejected by Rado, Lastri, and Kasih.

Controversy
Soap opera Intan has been accused of plagiarising the Korean drama "Be Strong Geum Soon". Despite this accusation of plagiarism, SinemArt included the original title of its Korean drama in the title credits.

Cast
 Naysila Mirdad as Intan
 Dude Harlino as Rado / Aditya
 Glenn Alinskie as Ello
 Ingka Noverita as Lila
 Meriam Bellina as Nadine
 Anwar Fuady as Armaan
 Hira Ninok Wiryono as Kasih
 Umar Lubis as dr. Frans
 Rico Tampatty as Fajar
 Nani Widjaja as Lastri
 Nunu Datau as Wina
 Mathias Muchus as Ardi
 Rama Michael as Romi
 Indah Indriana as Rena
 Sandy Tumiwa as Gery
 Zora Vidyanata as Sinta
 Manfreed as Jemmy
 Vera Detty as Nia
 Salma Paramitha as Bintang
 Alyssa Taradipa as Tiara
 Kevin Julio as Kevin
 Ricardo Silienzie as Bobby
 Rayn Wijaya as Ardi
 Kenny Austin as Fandi
 Lorenzo Abraham as Jodi
 Riyanto RA as Surya
 Virgo Brody as Mico
 Farah Debby as Nita
 Anneke Jodi as Rosa
 Rio Reifan as Dewa
 Ryan Maladi as Rangga
 Kiwil as Rizki
 Damara Adelardo as Yogi

References

External links
  Review on RCTI 
  Intan Plot From SinemArt

2006 Indonesian television series debuts
2007 Indonesian television series endings
Indonesian television series
Indonesian television soap operas
RCTI original programming